You Have to Be Beautiful is a 1951 German musical comedy film directed by Ákos Ráthonyi and starring Sonja Ziemann, Willy Fritsch and Anny Ondra. The film's sets were designed by art director Mathias Matthiess. It was Ondra's final film apart from a brief cameo role in The Affairs of Julie.

It was made at the Wandsbek Studios of the Hamburg-based Real Film.

Plot
Impresario Zwickel (Rudolf Platte) fears for the preview of the new operetta. One day remains to complete the fragmentary opus. The complete finale is missing. While Zwickel is plodding to bring the dawdling composer duo Jupp (Willy Fritsch) and Juppi (Hardy Krüger) Holunder up to speed, there is mobbing going on behind the scenery: chorister Maria Schippe (Sonja Ziemann) accuses diva Rose (Anny Ondra) only to strike false notes. When the offended star refuses to enter the stage, Maria gets her great chance.

Cast

References

Bibliography 
 Bock, Hans-Michael & Bergfelder, Tim. The Concise CineGraph. Encyclopedia of German Cinema. Berghahn Books, 2009.

External links 
 

1951 films
1951 musical comedy films
German musical comedy films
West German films
1950s German-language films
Films directed by Ákos Ráthonyi
Films shot at Wandsbek Studios
German black-and-white films
1950s German films